New Zealand Knights Football Club was a New Zealand professional football club based in Auckland. The club was founded in 2004 and played in the A-League until they became defunct in 2007.

This list encompasses the records set by New Zealand Knights, their managers and their players. The player records section includes details of the club's leading goalscorers and those who have made most appearances in first-team competitions. The club's attendance records at North Harbour Stadium, their home ground, are also included in the list.

The club's record appearance maker is Darren Bazeley, who made 47 appearances between 2005 and 2007, and the club's record goalscorers are Jeremy Brockie and Simon Yeo who scored 4 goals apiece.

Player record

Appearances
 Youngest first-team player: Jeremy Brockie – 17 years, 296 days (against Queensland Roar, Pre-Season Challenge Cup, 30 July 2005) 
 Oldest first-team player: Scot Gemmill – 36 years, 9 days (against Central Coast Mariners, A-League, 11 January 2007)
 Most consecutive appearances: Darren Bazeley, 43 (from 28 August 2005 to 10 December 2006)

Most appearances
Competitive, professional matches only. Appearances as substitute (in parentheses) included in total.

Goalscorers 
 Most goals in a season in all competitions: 4
 Jeremy Brockie, 2005–06
 Simon Yeo, 2005–06
 Most League goals in a season: 
 Jeremy Brockie, 2005–06
 Simon Yeo, 2005–06
 Top League scorer with fewest goals in a season: 2
 Neil Emblen, 2006–07
 Noah Hickey, 2006–07
 Most goals scored in a match: 2 – Jeremy Brockie v Newcastle Jets, 4 November 2005
 Youngest first-team goalscorer: Jeremy Brockie – 18 years, 28 days (against Newcastle Jets, A-League, 4 November 2005)
 Oldest first-team goalscorer: Neil Emblen – 35 years, 216 days (against Perth Glory, A-League, 21 January 2007)

Overall scorers 
Competitive, professional matches only, appearances including substitutes appear in brackets.

Internationals 
 First international: Danny Hay for New Zealand against Australia (9 June 2005)
 Most international caps (total): 50 – Jeremy Brockie – New Zealand (2 while with the club)

Managerial records 
 First full-time manager: John Adshead
 Longest-serving manager: John Adshead

Team records

Matches 
 First competitive match: Sydney FC 3–1 New Zealand Knights, A-League Pre-Season Challenge Cup, 24 July 2005
 First A-League match: Queensland Roar 2–0 New Zealand Knights, 28 August 2005
 First match at North Harbour Stadium: New Zealand Knights 0–5 Queensland Roar, 30 July 2005

Record wins
 Record win:
 2–0 v Central Coast Mariners, A-League, 10 September 2005
 3–1 v Queensland Roar, A-League, 29 December 2006
 2–0 v Perth Glory, A-League, 21 January 2007
Record League win:
 2–0 v Central Coast Mariners, 10 September 2005
 3–1 v Queensland Roar, 29 December 2006
 2–0 v Perth Glory, 21 January 2007
 Record home win:
 3–1 v Queensland Roar, A-League, 29 December 2006
 2–0 v Perth Glory, A-League, 21 January 2007
 Record away win: 2–0 v Central Coast Mariners, A-League, 10 September 2005

Record defeats
 Record defeat:0–5
 v Queensland Roar, A-League Pre-Season Challenge Cup, 30 July 2005
 v Queensland Roar, A-League, 15 September 2006
 Record League defeat: 0–5 v Queensland Roar, 15 September 2006
 Record A-League Pre-Season Challenge Cup defeat: 0–5 v Queensland Roar, 30 July 2005
 Record home defeat: 0–5 v Queensland Roar, A-League Pre-Season Challenge Cup, 30 July 2005
 Record away defeat: 0–5 v Queensland Roar, A-League Pre-Season Challenge Cup, 30 July 2005

Streaks
 Longest unbeaten run: 4 matches, 29 December 2006 to 21 January 2007
 Longest winning streak: 2 matches, 29 December 2006 to 7 January 2007
 Longest losing streak: 11 matches, 18 September 2005 to 26 November 2005
 Longest streak without a win: 25 matches, 18 September 2005 to 27 August 2006
 Longest non-scoring run: 6 matches, 10 September 2006 to 14 October 2006
 Longest streak without conceding a goal: 3 matches, 7 January 2007 to 21 January 2007

Wins/draws/losses in a season
 Most wins in a league season: 5 – 2006–07
 Most draws in a league season: 4 – 2006–07
 Most defeats in a league season: 17 – 2005–06
 Fewest wins in a league season: 1 – 2005–06
 Fewest draws in a league season: 3 – 2005–06
 Fewest defeats in a league season: 12 – 2006–07

Goals
 Most League goals scored in a season: 15 – 2005–06
 Fewest League goals scored in a season: 13 – 2006–07
 Most League goals conceded in a season: 47 – 2005–06
 Fewest League goals conceded in a season: 39 – 2006–07

Points
 Most points in a season: 19 – 2006–07
 Fewest points in a season: 6 – 2005–06

Attendances
 Highest home attendance: 9,827 v Sydney FC at North Harbour Stadium, A-League, 2 September 2005
 Highest away attendance: 20,725 v Brisbane Roar, A-League, 28 August 2005

References

New Zealand football club records and statistics
Records and statistics